Bessen Hollow or Bessen Branch is a stream in Crawford County in the U.S. state of Missouri. It is a tributary to Hinch Branch which it joins just west of Hinch.

Bessen Hollow has the name of a railroad worker.

See also
List of rivers of Missouri

References

Rivers of Crawford County, Missouri
Rivers of Missouri